WLSR (92.7 FM, "The Laser") is a radio station licensed to serve Galesburg, Illinois, United States.  The station, established in 1980 as a sister station to WAIK (1590 AM), is currently owned by the Galesburg Broadcasting Company.

WLSR broadcasts a modern rock music format.

The station was assigned the call sign WLSR by the Federal Communications Commission on July 3, 1997.

References

External links
WLSR official website

LSR
Modern rock radio stations in the United States
Knox County, Illinois
Radio stations established in 1980